Felice Giordano (6 January 1825 – 16 July 1892) was an Italian engineer and geologist.

Giordano was born at Turin. He had an important role in the organisation of a geological service in the Kingdom of Italy and in the foundation of the Italian Geological Society. In 1863, together with Quintino Sella and Bartolomeo Gastaldi, he founded the Italian Alpine Club.  He was also involved in the first ascent of the Matterhorn and he was portrayed in several related films such as The Mountain Calls and The Challenge.

He died at Vallombrosa  in  1892.

References
The earth sciences in the scientific letters of Giovanni Capellini
Felice GIORDANO (1825-1892) (French)

1825 births
1892 deaths
Engineers from Turin